Rozin is a surname. Notable people with the surname include:

 Danny Rozin (born 1961), Israeli-American artist
 Paul Rozin (born 1936), American psychology professor at the University of Pennsylvania
 Špela Rozin  (born 1943), Slovenian actress
 Yehoshua Rozin (1918–2002), Israeli basketball coach